Yangan is a rural town and locality in the Southern Downs Region, Queensland, Australia.

Geography
The locality is traversed by Swan Creek, a tributary of the Condamine River.  Sandstone is extracted from a quarry directly south of the town's centre from a property which fronts Swan Creek.

History
The district was known as Upper Swan Creek, but in 1887 took the name Yangan from its railway station. The name Yangan is reported to be an Aboriginal word meaning proceed or go away.

Swan Creek (No. 2) School opened on 27 May 1874. In 1878 it was renamed Swan Creek Upper State School. In 1887 it became Yangan State School.

On Monday 15 May 1905, the Bishop of Brisbane St Clair Donaldson consecrated the new Anglican church, St Peter's. The architect was Conrad Dornbusch and the contractor was Mr J. Purcell. The final service was held on Palm Sunday 25 March 2018 and a deconsecration service was held on Saturday 21 July 2018.

Heritage listings 
Yangan has a number of heritage-listed sites, including:
 7-9 King Street: Yangan School of Arts
 36 King Street: Yangan Masonic Hall

Amenities 
The Southern Downs Regional Council operates a mobile library service which visits Yangan Park in King Street.

Education 
Yangan State School is a government primary (Prep-6) school for boys and girls at 49A King Street. In 2017, the school had an enrolment of 90 students with 7 teachers (6 full-time equivalent) and 7 non-teaching staff (4 full-time equivalent).

References

External links

 
 Town map of Yangan, 1990

Towns in Queensland
Southern Downs Region
Localities in Queensland